The third USS Raritan (LSM-540) was a  in the United States Navy following World War II. She was named for a river in New Jersey.

Service history
Raritan was laid down on 10 May 1945 at Brown Shipbuilding Company, Houston, Texas, launched in August 1945, commissioned as USS LSM-540 on 6 December 1945, Lieutenant Roy T. Rector, USNR in command.  She was decommissioned on 29 May 1946, at Green Cove Springs, Florida and laid up in the Atlantic Reserve Fleet, Florida Group, Green Cove Springs.

Recommissioned on 4 November 1957, she was renamed USS Raritan (LSM-540) on 14 October 1959, then decommissioned on 1 December 1959 at Norfolk, Virginia, and struck from the Naval Vessel Register on 1 January 1960.

References

External links
 

Ships built in Houston
1945 ships
LSM-1-class landing ships medium
Atlantic Reserve Fleet, Green Cove Springs Group